The Green River is a tributary of the Heart River, approximately 20 mi (32 km) long, in western North Dakota in the United States.

It rises in the prairie country of southwestern Billings County, near Saddle Buttes, and flows ESE past New Hradec, and joins the Heart near Gladstone.

See also
List of North Dakota rivers

References

Rivers of North Dakota
Rivers of Billings County, North Dakota
Rivers of Dunn County, North Dakota
Rivers of Stark County, North Dakota